Cyclotorna diplocentra is a moth of the family Cyclotornidae. It is found in Australia, including New South Wales and Queensland.

Original description

External links
Images at CSIRO Entomology
Proceedings of the Linnean Society of New South Wales

Moths of Australia
Cyclotornidae
Moths described in 1913